Pauline is an unincorporated community in Shawnee County, Kansas, United States.  Located south of Topeka, it lies next to Forbes Field on southwest Topeka Boulevard.  It is occasionally seen as part of the South City Industry Park for Topeka with its many large businesses.

History
The first post office in Pauline was established in 1872.

There are about 30 houses along with about 20 mobile homes in the mobile home park.  Businesses there include three restaurants, two gas stations, an auction house, a bar, a laundromat, and a grocery store. Pauline also has a Super 8 Motel and a modern campground with hook-ups.

See also
 Old Prairie Town at Ward-Meade Historic Site
 Topeka metropolitan area

References

Further reading

External links
 Shawnee County maps: Current, Historic, KDOT

Unincorporated communities in Kansas
Unincorporated communities in Shawnee County, Kansas
Topeka metropolitan area, Kansas